Steve Combs (born July 22, 1941) is an American wrestler. He competed in the men's freestyle 78 kg at the 1968 Summer Olympics.

References

External links
 

1941 births
Living people
American male sport wrestlers
Olympic wrestlers of the United States
Wrestlers at the 1968 Summer Olympics
People from Moline, Illinois